The Seychelles spurdog (Squalus lalannei) is a dogfish described in 2003. It is a member of the family Squalidae, found off the Seychelles.

References

Squalus
Fish described in 2003